Tam O'Shanter was a sailing ship built in 1829 in North Hylton. In 1830 she sailed to India under a license from the British East India Company (EIC). Next, she was a West Indiaman, sailing to Bermuda and Jamaica. She then played a role in the founding of Adelaide in 1836. Tam O'Shanter ran aground in 1837 off Tasmania and was considered a write-off.

Career
The original owner was Captain Lindsey. She first appeared in Lloyd's Register in 1830.

In 1813 the EIC had lost its monopoly on the trade between India and Britain. British ships were then free to sail to India or the Indian Ocean under a license from the EIC. Captain T.Lindsay sailed for Madras and Bengal on 4 July 1830.

In 1835 Thomas Dobson bought her, and the merchant Osmond Gilles chartered her as part of the First Fleet of South Australia. In 1836 Tam O'Shanter, Whiteman Freeman, master, accompanied  on the trip, with Gilles travelling on Buffalo. They left London on 29 July arriving at Kingscote on 20 November. They then entered Holdfast Bay, but ran aground when they tried to enter Port River.

Tam O'Shanter ran aground on 19 December 1836, was refloated on 23 December, and was beached.

Tam O'Shanter was carrying a consignment of books from the South Australian Literary and Scientific Association, which had been formed in London in 1834. This included 117 books provided by Robert Gouger, who had arrived shortly before on board . A mishap occurred whilst unloading, and the trunk containing the 200 books fell in the sea. However they were recovered undamaged. These books constituted the kernel of what was to become the State Library of South Australia.

Fate
She was on a voyage from South Australia to Sydney.

See also
First Fleet of South Australia

Citations

References
 

History of South Australia
1829 ships
Ships built on the River Wear
Maritime incidents in December 1836
Maritime incidents in August 1837
Migrant ships to Australia